Himantolophus paucifilosus is a species of marine fish of the family Himantolophidae, the footballfishes, a type of anglerfish. It occurs in the east central Atlantic Ocean, from Cape Verde and Senegal in the north to Namibia and Angola in the south, and also on the coast of Brazil.

References

Himantolophidae
Deep sea fish
Fish described in 1988
Fish of the Atlantic Ocean
Fish of Africa
Fish of Angola
Fish of West Africa
Fish of Brazil